Castlerock is a seaside village in County Londonderry, Northern Ireland. It is five miles west of Coleraine, and part of Causeway Coast and Glens district. It is very popular with summer tourists, with numerous apartment blocks and two caravan sites. Castlerock Golf Club has both 9-hole and 18-hole links courses bounded by the beach, the River Bann and the Belfast to Derry railway line. The village had a population of 1,287 people at the 2011 census, and is where near by village Articlave F.C play their home games.

History 

Local historical interest is concentrated on the 18th century Bishop of Derry's ruined Downhill House, the Mussenden Temple on the clifftop, and the Black Glen set within the Downhill Estate, which is now owned by the National Trust. The palace and estate were created by Frederick Hervey, 4th Earl of Bristol who was the Bishop of Derry in the 1780s. The Mussenden Temple, with its precarious perch on the basalt cliff edge is one of the most photographed scenes in Ireland.

The 17th century Hezlett House is a thatched cottage with a cruck structure and is situated at the crossroads near the village. Built around 1691, it was originally a rectory or farmhouse. Also at the adjacent crossroads is an ancient tree.

The bodies of the two victims of infamous dentist Colin Howell were found in Castlerock on 19 May 1991.

Castlerock was relatively untouched by the Troubles, with only one fatal incident occurring in or near the village as part of the conflict. The "Castlerock killings" took place in March 1993, when four men were shot dead by a group calling itself "Ulster Freedom Fighters", a covername used by the Ulster Defence Association (UDA). One of the men convicted for the murders was Coleraine loyalist Torrens Knight.

Demography

2001 Census 
Castlerock is classified as a village by the Northern Ireland Statistics and Research Agency (NISRA) (i.e. with population between 1,000 and 2,250 people). On Census day (29 April 2001) there were 1,326 people living in Castlerock. Of these:

 22.2% were aged under 16 and 22.3% were aged 60 and over
 46.6% of the population were male and 53.4% were female
 14.5% were from a Catholic background and 82.3% were from a Protestant background
 3.4% of people aged 16–74 were unemployed.

For more details see: NI Neighbourhood Information Service

2011 Census
On Census day in 2011, 16.5% were from a Catholic background and 77.8% were from a Protestant background.

Transport
Castlerock railway station opened on 18 July 1853. Northern Ireland Railways currently run a mostly hourly service in both directions (west to Londonderry Waterside or east to Coleraine and onward to Belfast Lanyon Place and Belfast Great Victoria Street) daily, and only five trains each way on Sunday. Ulsterbus services tend to coincide roughly with the times of the railway service and proceed either west towards Limavady or east to Coleraine.

Facilities
Castlerock is home to Guysmere Summer Camp, which is owned and run by the Presbyterian Church.

Castlerock Golf Club has the Mussendan course, an 18 hole Championship links course and the Bann course, a 9 hole links course.

Education
Hezlett Primary School
Ballyhacket Primary School (Closed in 2021 due to dwindling pupil numbers)

People 
The actor James Nesbitt lived in Castlerock as a teenager.

The village was a holiday destination for the famous author C. S. Lewis. Born in Belfast, he holidayed in Castlerock as a child and took inspiration from Downhill House for some of his books including The Lion, the Witch and the Wardrobe.

See also 
 List of towns and villages in Northern Ireland

References

External links 
 

Villages in County Londonderry
Seaside resorts in Northern Ireland
Causeway Coast and Glens district